This page details the process of qualifying for the 1972 African Cup of Nations.

Qualifying Tournament

First round

|}

Zambia won 6–2 on aggregate.

Congo-Brazzaville won 2–1 on aggregate.

Ivory Coast won 3–1 on aggregate.

Congo-Kinshasa won 5–1 on aggregate.

Togo won 2–1 on aggregate.

Mauritius won 5–3 on aggregate.

Kenya won 3–0 on aggregate.

Morocco won 4–3 on aggregate.

Mali won 4–1 on aggregate.

Egypt won 3–1 on aggregate.

Guinea won 1–0 on aggregate.

Ghana progress, Upper Volta withdrew.

Second round

|}

Morocco won 5–3 on aggregate.

Zaire won 4–2 on aggregate.

Togo won 1–0 on aggregate.

Mali won 3–1 on aggregate.

Congo-Brazzaville won 4–3 on aggregate.

Kenya won 2–1 on aggregate.

Qualified teams
The 8 qualified teams are:

External links
CAN 1972 details - rsssf.com

Africa Cup of Nations qualification
Qualification
Qual